The year 2003 is the 15th year in the history of Shooto, a mixed martial arts promotion based in Japan. In 2003 Shooto held 17 events beginning with, Shooto: 1/24 in Korakuen Hall.

Title fights

Events list

Shooto: 1/24 in Korakuen Hall

Shooto: 1/24 in Korakuen Hall was an event held on January 24, 2003, at Korakuen Hall in Tokyo, Japan.

Results

Shooto: 2/6 in Kitazawa Town Hall

Shooto: 2/6 in Kitazawa Town Hall was an event held on February 6, 2003, at Kitazawa Town Hall in Setagaya, Tokyo, Japan.

Results

Shooto: 2/23 in Korakuen Hall

Shooto: 2/23 in Korakuen Hall was an event held on February 23, 2003, at Korakuen Hall in Tokyo, Japan.

Results

Shooto: 3/18 in Korakuen Hall

Shooto: 3/18 in Korakuen Hall was an event held on March 18, 2003, at Korakuen Hall in Tokyo, Japan.

Results

Shooto: Gig Central 3

Shooto: Gig Central 3 was an event held on March 30, 2003, at The Nagoya Civic Assembly Hall in Nagoya, Aichi, Japan.

Results

Shooto: 5/4 in Korakuen Hall

Shooto: 5/4 in Korakuen Hall was an event held on May 4, 2003, at Korakuen Hall in Tokyo, Japan.

Results

Shooto: Shooter's Dream 2

Shooto: Shooter's Dream 2 was an event held on May 30, 2003, at Kitazawa Town Hall in Setagaya, Tokyo, Japan.

Results

Shooto 2003: 6/27 in Hiroshima Sun Plaza

Shooto 2003: 6/27 in Hiroshima Sun Plaza was an event held on June 27, 2003, at The Hiroshima Sun Plaza in Hiroshima, Japan.

Results

Shooto: 7/13 in Korakuen Hall

Shooto: 7/13 in Korakuen Hall was an event held on July 13, 2003, at Korakuen Hall in Tokyo, Japan.

Results

Shooto: 8/10 in Yokohama Cultural Gymnasium

Shooto: 8/10 in Yokohama Cultural Gymnasium was an event held on August 10, 2003, at Yokohama Cultural Gymnasium in Yokohama, Kanagawa, Japan.

Results

Shooto: 9/5 in Korakuen Hall

Shooto: 9/5 in Korakuen Hall was an event held on September 5, 2003, at Korakuen Hall in Tokyo, Japan.

Results

Shooto: Gig Central 4

Shooto: Gig Central 4 was an event held on September 21, 2003, at Port Messe Nagoya in Nagoya, Aichi, Japan.

Results

Shooto: Gig West 4

Shooto: Gig West 4 was an event held on October 12, 2003, at The Namba Grand Kagetsu Studio in Osaka, Japan.

Results

Shooto: Who is Young Leader!

Shooto: Who is Young Leader! was an event held on October 31, 2003, at Kitazawa Town Hall in Tokyo, Japan.

Results

Shooto: Wanna Shooto 2003

Shooto: Wanna Shooto 2003 was an event held on November 3, 2003, at Korakuen Hall in Tokyo, Japan.

Results

Shooto: 11/25 in Kitazawa Town Hall

Shooto: 11/25 in Kitazawa Town Hall was an event held on November 25, 2003, at Kitazawa Town Hall in Setagaya, Tokyo, Japan.

Results

Shooto: Year End Show 2003

Shooto: Year End Show 2003 was an event held on December 14, 2003, at The Tokyo Bay NK Hall in Urayasu, Chiba, Japan.

Results

See also 
 Shooto
 List of Shooto champions
 List of Shooto Events

References

Shooto events
2003 in mixed martial arts